The Anthony United States Post Office, listed on the National Register of Historic Places as US Post Office--Anthony, is located at 121 W. Steadman in Anthony, Kansas.  It was built in 1939.  It was listed on the National Register in 1989.

It was deemed significant "for its historical association with the Treasury Department's Section program and for the artistic significance of the mural that it contains. The mural, "Turning a Corner", was painted by St. Louis artist Joe Jones (1901-1963) in 1939 and depicts three farmers using a combine to thresh wheat.

References

Government buildings on the National Register of Historic Places in Kansas
Neoclassical architecture in Kansas
Government buildings completed in 1939
Harper County, Kansas